An Old Fashioned Boy is a surviving 1920 American silent comedy romance film directed by Jerome Storm and starring Charles Ray. Famous Players-Lasky produced along with producer Thomas Ince. It was released by Paramount Pictures.

Plot
As described in a film magazine, David Warrington (Ray) is an old fashioned boy with old fashioned ideas regarding marriage, living in a real home, babies, and the like. He is in love with Betty Graves (Shannon), a young woman who believes in the modern phases of life. After several heartaches and numerous comical situations, things shape themselves out so that Betty finds herself in her sweetheart's arms on the way to the minister for the wedding, having been convinced that the old fashioned way is the best after all.

Cast
Charles Ray as David Warrington
Ethel Shannon as Betty Graves
Alfred Allen as Dr. Graves
Wade Boteler as Herbert
Grace Morse as Sybil
Gloria Joy as Violet
Frankie Lee as Herbie
Hallam Cooley as Fredie
Virginia Brown as The Baby

Preservation status
Prints exist at the Library of Congress, Gosfilmofond, UCLA Film and Television Archive.

References

External links
 

1920 films
American silent feature films
Films directed by Jerome Storm
Paramount Pictures films
American black-and-white films
American romantic comedy films
1920 romantic comedy films
1920s American films
Silent romantic comedy films
Silent American comedy films
1920s English-language films